David Chalmin is a French composer, producer, sound engineer and musician. He's a member of the trio Triple Sun.

His collaborations extend from classical music to experimental rock: Katia and Marielle Labèque, Thom Yorke, The National (band), Madonna, Rufus Wainwright, Matt Elliott, Kalakan, Shannon Wright, etc...

His work as a composer have been performed in places such as Los Angeles Philharmony-Disney Hall, Philharmonie de Paris, Salle Pleyel, WDR Rundfunkorchester Köln, London's King's Place, or the Toronto Koerner's Hall

David Chalmin runs two recording studios, Studio K Paris and Studio LFO in the Basque Region.

Discography 
 2006 : Red Velvet (KML Recordings)
 2007 : Dimension X (with Massimo Pupillo ZU, and Chris Corsano) (KML Recordings)
 2008 : B For Bang - Across The Universe of Languages (KML Recordings)
 2011 : B For Bang - Rewires The Beatles (KML Recordings)
 2013 : Minimalist Dream House (KML Recordings)
 2014 : UBUNOIR (Debout!)
 2016 : Triple Sun - The City Lies In Ruins (Consouling Sounds)
 2017 : Katia & Marielle Labèque - Love Stories (KML Recordings/Deutsche Grammophon)
 2018 : Moondog (KML Recordings/Deutsche Grammophon)
 2019 : David Chalmin - La Terre Invisible (Ici d'Ailleurs)
 2022 : Innocence (Yotanka)

Productions

Katia & Marielle Labèque 

 2009 : Erik Satie
 2009 : Shape Of My heart (feat. Sting)
 2010 : The New CD box
 2011 : Gershwin-Bernstein, Rhapsody in Blue - West Side Story
 2011 : Nazareno
 2013 : Minimalist Dream House
 2015 : Sisters
 2016 : Invocations
 2018 : El Chan

Matt Elliott 

 2013 : Only Myocardial Infarction Can Break Your Heart (Ici d'ailleurs...)
 2016 : The Calm Before (Ici d'ailleurs...)

Others 

 2010 : Kalakan - Kalakan
 2011 : Nadéah - Venus Gets Even
 2015 : Angélique Ionatos - Reste la lumière
 2015 : Gaspar Claus & Pedro Soler
 2016 : Shannon Wright - Division
 2017 : Zu - Jhator (orchestra recording)
 2017 : The National - Sleep Well Beast (orchestra recording)

References

External links 
David Chalmin website
KML Recordings

French composers
French record producers
Year of birth missing (living people)
Musicians from Paris
Living people